"Talk About Love" is a song by Swedish singer Zara Larsson, featuring vocals from American rapper Young Thug. It was released through TEN Music Group and Epic Records on 8 January 2021 as the third single from Larsson's third studio album, Poster Girl. It was co-written by Thug and its producer Mike Sabath, as well as Amy Allen and Dewain Whitmore Jr. It has been described as a R&B-styled song.

Background
Larsson explained about the song, "'Talk About Love' is about that phase before two people work out what they are to one another. That specific window is so beautiful and fragile, as soon as you start asking 'are we doing this?' or 'how do *you* feel?', for some people that ruins the magic. 'Talk About Love' is savoring that moment before you have to decide."

Music video
The music video directed by Larsson herself along with Ryder Ripps was filmed in London and features Larsson's real life boyfriend Lamin Holmén. It was premiered on 8 January 2021 and includes an "emotive dance sequence" while the couple hangs out at home.

Charts

References

2021 singles
2021 songs
Songs written by Amy Allen (songwriter)
Songs written by Dewain Whitmore Jr.
Songs written by Mike Sabath
Songs written by Young Thug
Young Thug songs
Zara Larsson songs